Seri Mulia Sarjana School, formerly known as PDS School, known in the Malay language as Sekolah Seri Mulia Sarjana and abbreviated as SMSS, is located in the Brunei-Muara District of Brunei. It was founded on 13 January 1992.

History 
Originally a preschool with 14 students, it has grown to include the Primary Levels and has enrolled 1000 students in five years.

Today it caters for over 2,000 students and is among the five private schools nationwide offering Secondary Level Education. It has expanded to three locations, each catering to a curricular level. It is also the youngest private school to have been granted a Secondary Section in Brunei Darussalam.

The logo 

 Blue symbolizes the peace and nobility of Negara Brunei Darussalam
 Red symbolizes ambition and the zeal to excel
 White symbolizes the innocence of youth and purity of soul
 The Book and Pen symbolize learning and acquisition of knowledge
 Yellow Leaves connote the leadership quality that the school would like to develop in her students (i.e. in accordance to the principles of "Melayu Islam Beraja") and His Majesty's Government
 The Torch epitomizes the aim of the school in giving her students a bright future with the power of knowledge and sound moral values.

Seri mulia sarjana school alma mater
Seri Mulia Sarjana School,
You are the cradle of wisdom,
Moulding us with love, care and patience,
Leading us to be the best.

You’re the ocean of knowledge, the palace of the wise,
With your guidance, lead us to follow,
Achieve excellence in everything we do,
Without fear, we can spread our wings to fly,

Excellence, patience, health of mind and body,
Loyal to his Majesty and country,
These values and virtues for which you stand,
With grateful hearts, we thank you,
We love you, our Alma Mater!

Seri Mulia,
Seri Mulia Sarjana School,
Sarjana School.
[1].For International School students pledge as "Seri Mulia Sarjana International School"

References 

Private schools in Brunei
Primary schools in Brunei
Secondary schools in Brunei